Andy Brooks is the general secretary of the New Communist Party of Britain. He was formerly a member of the Communist Party of Great Britain, and joined the NCP upon its foundation in 1977. He has been a member of the NCP Central Committee since 1979. He had previously been international secretary, editor of the party's paper, The New Worker, and deputy general secretary before succeeding Eric Trevett as NCP general secretary in 1995. Trevett subsequently took up the newly created post of NCP president.

References

External links
1997 interview
2020 interview
Oliver Cromwell and the Good Old Cause article in New Worker

British communists
Communist Party of Great Britain members
Anti-revisionists
New Communist Party of Britain members
Living people
Year of birth missing (living people)